Odice jucunda, the delightful marbled, is a species of moth of the family Erebidae. It is found on the Iberian Peninsula and the southern France.

External links

Fauna Europaea
Lepiforum.de

Boletobiinae
Moths of Europe
Taxa named by Jacob Hübner
Moths described in 1813